Norman Blann Rice (born May 4, 1943) is an American politician who served as the 49th mayor of Seattle, Washington, serving two terms from 1990 to 1997. Rice was Seattle's first elected African-American mayor.

Early life
Rice graduated from the University of Washington in Seattle, earning a bachelor's degree in communications and a Master of Public Administration from the university's Daniel J. Evans School of Public Affairs. He became a member of Alpha Phi Alpha fraternity. In 1975, he married Dr. Constance Williams.

Before entering city government, Rice worked as a reporter at KOMO-TV News and KIXI radio. He served as Assistant Director of the Seattle Urban League. He next worked as Executive Assistant and Director of Government Services for the Puget Sound Council of Governments.

Political life
Rice was first elected to the Seattle City Council in 1978 to fill a vacancy. He was reelected in 1979, 1983 and 1987, serving eleven years in all. He served as chairs of the Energy, Finance, and Budget committees, and was Council President for one term. Rice facilitated the development of more equitable cost allocation and rate design procedures for Seattle City Light as part of his work on the Energy Committee.

His accomplishments on the Finance and Budget Committee included the passage of the Women and Minority Business Enterprise Ordinance, and from 1982 to 1987, the elimination of City investments in firms doing business in apartheid-era South Africa.

He ran for mayor in 1985, but lost to Charles Royer. Rice ran again in 1989 in a crowded field and won 99,699 to 75,446. He was re-elected in 1993.

During the technology boom of the 1990s, Rice led the rejuvenation of Seattle's downtown. He also served as President of the U.S. Conference of Mayors.

In 1995, Rice served as a committee member for the Rudy Bruner Award for Urban Excellence.

In 1996, Rice ran in the Democratic primary for Governor of Washington, but he was defeated by then-King County Executive Gary Locke.

In 1997, Rice made a guest appearance as himself on an episode of Frasier, entitled "The 1000th Show."

Civic life

Rice was CEO and then president of the Federal Home Loan Bank of Seattle from 1998 to 2004.

In June 2009, Rice was named CEO of the non-profit Seattle Foundation, serving in that post until December, 2013. In December 2010, he was nominated as one of 30 members for a two-year appointment in the White House Council for Community Solutions, created by Executive Order of President Barack Obama.

In 2011, Rice was serving a three-year term as a Distinguished Practitioner-in-Residence at the University of Washington’s Daniel J. Evans School of Public Affairs and lead the project Civic Engagement in the 21st Century.

Honors and legacy
Rice has been awarded honorary degrees by Cornish College of the Arts, Seattle University, the University of Puget Sound, and Whitman College.

 Municipal League of King County’s James. R. Ellis Regional Leadership Award (with John Stanton)
 The American Jewish Federation’s Human Relations Award (with wife Constance Rice)
 National Neighborhood Coalition’s National Award for Leadership on Behalf of Neighborhoods
 King County Chapter of the YWCA’s Isabel Coleman Pierce Award
 Washington Council on Crime and Delinquency’s Mark F. Cooper Leadership Award
 American Association of Community College Students’ Outstanding Alumni Award

See also

 Timeline of Seattle, 1990s

References

External links
Guide to the Norm Rice City Council, Subject Files 1973-1992, Washington State University
Guide to the Mayor Norm Rice Photographs 1990-1997, Washington State University Libraries
 Norman B. Rice, University of Washington.

1943 births
African-American people in Washington (state) politics
African-American mayors in Washington (state)
Evans School of Public Policy and Governance alumni
Living people
Mayors of Seattle
Presidents of the United States Conference of Mayors
Seattle City Council members
University of Washington faculty
Washington (state) Democrats
21st-century African-American people
20th-century African-American people